Bandelierkop is a village some 35 km south-west of Louis Trichardt and 70 km north-east of Polokwane on the N1 National Route. Afrikaans for 'bandolier hill"; said to have been named after an incident in which a burgher, Jan du Preez, was sent back to fetch the bandolier he had left behind when the commando struck camp.

References

Populated places in the Makhado Local Municipality